Amartya Bobo Rahut is an Indian singer-songwriter, music producer and an independent artist from Mumbai, India. Bobo has composed and produced music for films, albums and singles such as Shaam Simti, Kaisi Ho ?, Darbaan, Tu Hai Mera Sunday, Drive, Aurangzeb, Uttarayan, Tumhari Sulu, Yadon Ke Idiot Box Mein, Om The Fusion Band, etc.

Bobo has also done music for over 2500 TV commercials, and he has worked for some of the biggest brands and campaigns including Godrej, ITC, McDonald's, Hero Motocorp, Bharti AXA, HDFC Bank, Max New York, Haywards, Kingfisher IPL, Kurkure, Mirinda, Thums Up etc. Bobo has to his credit, the bronze at Cannes Lions International Festival of Creativity for his Levi's Slim Fit Commercial for best soundtrack. He also won the award for best soundtrack at Promax Awards for the MTV/Nickelodeon's ‘Jingle Bell – Bhangra Version’. Bobo has composed various signature tunes such as Colors TV's Flute Tune, BSNL's Signature Tune, Godrej's Whistle Mnemonic, Pepperfry's Brand Tune, etc.

He is currently working on his independent music.

Early life

After completing his schooling & higher education from St. Xavier's College, Kolkata, Bobo has started his professional career as a guitar player in Kolkata in 1992 with some of the biggest acts at that time namely – Shiva, The Fifth Dimension, Cactus, Paras Pathor (founding member), Prakriti, Asteroids etc.

It was during the later part of those formative years, Bobo made up his mind about becoming a music composer because he felt that would give him the maximum release of expression towards his art & he knew he had to take his art to places. Bobo opted for finding a bigger canvas and he decided to shift base to Mumbai in the year 2001.

After going through an intense but supremely enriching phase of extreme struggle to get going and survive in one of the most competitive cities in the world as far as music and media are concerned. Bobo finally managed to establish himself as one of the premier music composer & record producer for the thriving advertising industry.

Discography

Awards and recognition

References

External links
 
Amartya Bobo Rahut on YouTube
 

1977 births
Living people
Indian record producers
Jingle composers
Indian pop composers
Hindi film score composers
Bollywood playback singers
Musicians from West Bengal